This article lists appearances of the composer Pyotr Ilyich Tchaikovsky in popular media (e.g. films, drama music or otherwise).

Films

Biographical
Es war eine rauschende Ballnacht (1939, Germany; released in the US as "It Was a Gay Ballnight"; and on re-release as The Life and Loves of Tschaikovsky)
Tchaikovsky was played by Hans Stüwe
Heavenly Music (1943)
Tchaikovsky was played by Lionel Royce
This won an Oscar in 1944 for Best Short Subject–Two Reel 
None but the Lonely Heart (1944, USA)
Directed by Clifford Odets
Screenplay by Clifford Odets
Based on the novel by Richard Llewellyn
Carnegie Hall (1947)
Tchaikovsky was played by Alfonso D'Artega
Song of My Heart (1948, US).
Directed by Benjamin Glazer
Screenplay by Benjamin Glazer
Tchaikovsky was played by the Swedish actor Frank Sundström
allmovies.com link IMDB link
Tchaikovsky (1969, Russia)
Directed by Igor Talankin
Screenplay by Yuri Nagibin
Tchaikovsky was played by Innokenty Smoktunovsky
Nominated for an Academy Award for Best Foreign Language Film
allmovies.com link
The Music Lovers (1970, UK)
Directed by Ken Russell
Screenplay by Melvyn Bragg
Based on Beloved Friend, a collection of personal correspondence edited by Catherine Drinker Bowen and Barbara von Meck
Tchaikovsky was played by Richard Chamberlain
allmovies.com link

Films featuring Tchaikovsky's Music
Fantasia (1940, United States)
Directed by Samuel Armstrong, James Algar, Bill Roberts, Paul Satterfield, et al.
Story by Joe Grant, Dick Huemer
Tchaikovsky Nutcracker Suite
IMDB link
Together (2002, China)
Directed by Chen Kaige
Screenplay by Xue Xiaolu and Chen Kaige
Tchaikovsky Violin Concerto in D major, op.35 - Finale: Allegro vivacissimo
V For Vendetta (2006, Canada)
Directed by James McTeigue
Screenplay by Lilly Wachowski
Tchaikovsky 1812 Overture
IMDB link
The Concert (2009, France)
Directed by Radu Mihaileanu
Screenplay by Radu Mihaileanu
Tchaikovsky Violin Concerto in D major, op.35 - I. Allegro moderato
IMDB link
Sleeping Beauty (1959, United States)
Directed by Eric Larson, Wolfgang Reitherman, Les Clark, et al.
Screenplay by Erdman Penner
Tchaikovsky Sleeping Beauty 
IMDB link

Television 
The Peter Tchaikovsky Story (episode of Disneyland, 1959)
Tchaikovsky was played by Rex Hill as a boy and Grant Williams as a man
Pride or Prejudice (1993, UK)
BBC documentary
Various theories investigated regarding Tchaikovsky's death
Great Composers – Tchaikovsky (1997)
The voice of Tchaikovsky was provided by Sir Ian McKellen
Tchaikovsky (2007, UK)
Two-part docudrama on the composer's life
Episode 1: Tchaikovsky: The Creation of Genius (2007, UK)
Episode 2: Tchaikovsky: Fortune and Tragedy (2007, UK)
Tchaikovsky was played by Ed Stoppard
Part of BBC concept The Tchaikovsky Experience which consisted of several television and radio broadcasts of works by Tchaikovsky and Stravinsky, as well as programs about St. Petersburg and Moscow.

Music 
Shameful Vice
Opera by English composer Michael Finnissy
Libretto focuses on Tchaikovsky's last days and death
All Over The World
Song by British electronic pop group Pet Shop Boys
Contains uncredited sample of Tchaikovsky
Let There Be Rock
Rock song by AC/DC
References Tchaikovsky's influence on popular music.
Lynguistics
Hip Hop song by CunninLynguists
Contains sample of Tchaikovskys Violin Concerto in D Op 35 - 1. Allegro Moderato.
Roll Over Beethoven
Rock song by Chuck BerryReferences Tchaikovsky in the songs lyrics.

 Video Games The Evil Within 2Developed by  Tango Gameworks
Published by  Bethesda Softworks
 Tchaikovsky's orchestral piece Serenade for Strings in C major is associated with serial killer Stefano Valentini.What Remains of Edith FinchDeveloped by  Giant Sparrow
Published by  Annapurna Interactive
 During a baby's death scene, 'Waltz of the Flowers' plays from The NutcrackerPaper Mario: The Origami KingDeveloped by  Intelligent Systems
Published by  Nintendo
 The game features a comedic ballet production of Swan Lake, as well as a punk remix.Fallout 4Developed by  Bethesda Game Studios
Published by  Bethesda Softworks
 There is a classical music radio station in the game that features both Swan Lake and Marche Slave by Tchaikovsky.The Last of Us: Left BehindDeveloped by  Naughty Dog
Published by  Sony Computer Entertainment
 Tchaikovsky's piece String Quartet No. 3 (Tchaikovsky) is featured in the downloadable content of the video game The Last of UsDestiny (video game)Developed by  Bungie
Published by  Activision
 Symphony No. 6 (Tchaikovsky) is featured during several missions in which the player must interact with a Russian supercomputer, named Rasputin.Sea of ThievesDeveloped by  Rare
Published by  Xbox Game Studios
 A shortened version of the 1812 Overture is featured as a sea shanty in the game. It is playable by characters using any one of the game's four playable instruments.Little Big Planet 3''
Developed by  Sumo Digital
Published by  Sony Computer Entertainment
 A remix of 'Waltz of the Flowers' from The Nutcracker appears in the game.

References

 
Tchaikovsky
Tchaikovsky